Ruff Rider is the 3rd studio album by Jamaican recording artiste Tanya Stephens. This album is best known for the hit single "Handle the Ride".

Track listing

References

1997 debut albums
Tanya Stephens albums
VP Records albums